Epicynodontia is a clade of cynodont therapsids that includes most cynodonts, such as galesaurids, thrinaxodontids, and Eucynodontia (including mammals). It was erected as a stem-based taxon by Hopson and Kitching (2001) and defined as the most inclusive clade containing Mammalia and excluding Procynosuchus, a Late Permian genus that is one of the most basal cynodonts.

Below is a cladogram from Pusch et al. (2023) showing one hypothesis of cynodont relationships:

References

Cynodonts
Lopingian first appearances
Extant Permian first appearances
Tetrapod unranked clades
Taxa named by James Hopson
Taxa named by James Kitching